The 1999 Eastern Creek V8 Supercar round was the first round of the 1999 Shell Championship Series. It was held from 26 to 28 March at Eastern Creek Raceway in Sydney, New South Wales.

Race results

Qualifying

Privateers Race

Race 1

Race 2

Race 3

References

External links 

Eastern Creek
Motorsport at Eastern Creek Raceway